Jean Malrieu (29 August 1915, Montauban – 24 April 1976, Montauban) was a 20th-century French poet.

Biography 
He attended high school in his hometown and then studied law. He was mobilized in 1939. After the war, he practiced various trades, before becoming a teacher. He established friendly relations with the Surrealists and met André Breton on the occasion of the publication of his collection Préface à l'amour in 1953. He collaborated with several publications of the surrealist movement. As a communist militant, he distanced himself from the French Communist Party in 1956 after the Soviet intervention in Hungary. He evolved from a lyrical writing to a drier, sometimes more anguished writing, but always attentive to everyday objects, animals, plants and the earth that carries them. He asserted that poetry "requires rigorous language."

He created the magazines  (1950–1956, with Gérald Neveu) then Sud (1970), which would continue the action of Les Cahiers du Sud.

Prizes 
1953: Prix Guillaume Apollinaire
1963: Prix Antonin-Artaud

Bibliography 
1953: Préface à l'amour, Cahiers du Sud, Marseille, prix Guillaume Apollinaire
1963: Vesper, Prix Antonin Artaud
1968: le Nom secret suivi de La Vallée des Rois, Introduction de Georges Mounin, Honfleur, Pierre Jean Oswald
1971: Préface à l'amour suivi de Hectares de Soleil, Honfleur, Pierre Jean Oswald
1972: le Château cathare, Paris, 
1975: Possible imaginaire, Paris, Pierre Jean Oswald
1976: les Maisons de feuillages, Éditions Saint-Germain-des-Prés, Paris
1978: Mes manières instinctives (composed in 1958), Dijon, Brandes
2004: Libre comme une maison en flammes – Œuvres poétiques 1935–1976,

Studies on Jean Malrieu
2004: Jean Malrieu. L'inquiétude et la ferveur – A collective work with unpublished works by Jean Malrieu and studies by writers and scholars on various aspects of his work. Available at the Babel laboratory of the University of Toulon

External links 
 Jean Malrieu on Wikisource
 Gil Pressnitzer: Jean Malrieu Une vie noyée dans la lumière on Esprits nomades
 Jean Malrieu on Babelio
 MALRIEU JEAN on Encyclopaedia Universalis
 Jean Malrieu, le temps du désir on La pierre et le sel
 Jean Malrieu, la parole donnée on Temporel.fr

20th-century French poets
Surrealist poets
Prix Guillaume Apollinaire winners
1915 births
People from Montauban
1976 deaths